Party Mix! is a remix album by American new wave band the B-52's, released in 1981 by Warner Bros. Records.

Background
The album was released between the band's second album, Wild Planet (1980), and their Mesopotamia EP (1982). It was devised as a stop-gap release by the band's manager, Gary Kurfirst, while the band were working on the Mesopotamia sessions.

On the original vinyl, this six-song collection contained songs from their first two albums remixed and sequenced to form two long tracks, one on each side. On the CD version, however, all the songs feature their own tracks.

In 1991, Party Mix! and a 1990 remix version of Mesopotamia were combined and released as one CD in the US. In Europe, both albums were made available on separate CDs, with Mesopotamia retaining the original US mix.

Reception

Commercial
Party Mix! spent 11 weeks on the Billboard 200, peaking at No. 55.

Critical
Robert Christgau of The Village Voice observed that the album's "implicit equation of party and disco offends old new-wavers, but at EP list for half an hour's music the extravagance is recommended." Trouser Press opined that the album was "functional for discos but antithetical to the B-52's' minimalist precepts."

In a retrospective review for AllMusic, William Ruhlmann stated, "Since the group's bouncy songs are already dance-ready, this makes for alternatives rather than real improvements, even from a dancefloor perspective."

Track listing
Side one
"Party Out of Bounds" (Fred Schneider, Keith Strickland, Ricky Wilson, Cindy Wilson, Kate Pierson) – 5:12
"Private Idaho" (Schneider, Strickland, R. Wilson, C. Wilson, Pierson) – 4:04
"Give Me Back My Man" (Schneider, Strickland, R. Wilson, C. Wilson) – 7:02

Side two
"Lava" (The B-52's) – 6:08
"Dance This Mess Around" (The B-52's) – 2:59
"52 Girls" (Jeremy Ayers, R. Wilson) – 2:58

 Side one: original versions from Wild Planet (1980)
 Side two: original versions from The B-52's (1979)

Personnel
Credits adapted from Party Mix / Mesopotamia CD liner notes.

 Rhett Davies – producer (1–3)
 The B-52's – producers (1–3)
 Daniel Coulombe – remixing
 Steven Stanley – remixing
 Paul Wexler – remixing
 Chris Blackwell – producer (4–6)
 Robert Ash – associate producer (4–6)
 Tony Wright – cover
 Lynn Goldsmith – photograph

Chart performance

References

The B-52's EPs
Albums produced by Rhett Davies
Albums produced by Chris Blackwell
1981 EPs
1981 remix albums
Remix EPs
Warner Records remix albums
Warner Records EPs
The B-52's remix albums